Mirdza is a Latvian given name and may refer to: 
Mirdza Bendrupe (1910–1995), Latvian writer
Mirdza Ķempe (1907–1974), Latvian poet
Mirdza Martinsone (born 1951), Latvian actress
Mirdza Martinsone (1916–1983), Latvian skier 
Mirdza Zīvere (born 1953), Latvian singer

References

Latvian feminine given names
Feminine given names